Leon Lamar Wagner (May 13, 1934 – January 3, 2004) was an American professional baseball  left fielder who played Major League Baseball (MLB) for the San Francisco Giants (–), St. Louis Cardinals, Los Angeles Angels (–), Cleveland Indians (–), and Chicago White Sox. He batted left-handed and threw right-handed.

Born in Chattanooga, Tennessee, Wagner graduated from Tuskegee University. He was affectionately known as "Daddy Wags" during his playing days. This was due to his distinctive left-handed batting style and his notable and unique body gesticulations, primarily below the waist, before going into his devastating stride. His outfield play did not match his stellar hitting. He was at least briefly in the clothing business, advertising his venture as "Get your glad rags from "Daddy Wags". He was also known as "Cheeky" for his high cheekbones (being of half Native American and half African-American descent).

MLB career
Wagner, over the course of his 12-season MLB career, hit .272, with 211 home runs, and 669 RBI, in 1352 games.

Wagner broke into the big leagues at age 24 for the San Francisco Giants in their first year in San Francisco on June 22, 1958. A solid line-drive hitter and colorful player, he compiled a .307 batting average with 13 home runs in 74 games as a rookie. Competing for playing time against a congested Giant outfield that included Willie Mays, Felipe Alou, Orlando Cepeda, and Bill White (all of whom were superior fielders), he was traded to the Cardinals after the 1959 season.

Wagner was relegated to a reserve role for St. Louis in 39 games and hit four home runs; one of them was notable as being the first homer ever hit in Candlestick Park, on April 12, 1960, accounting for the lone Cardinal run in a 3–1 loss to his former team.

He took advantage of the opportunity, hitting .280, with 28 home runs, and 79 RBI, in 133 games. His most productive season came in 1962, when he blasted 37 homers (third highest in the AL), amassed 107 RBI, 96 runs, 164 hits, and 21 doubles (all career highs), while batting .268. Wagner played in both All-Star Games that season (two All-Star Games were held, each year from 1959 through 1962); in the second contest, he went 3-for-4, including a two-run home run. Wagner was voted the second All-Star game's most valuable player and became the first AL player to receive the All-Star Game MVP Award that was first introduced that year and for both games. The first true slugger in Angel history, he hit 91 home runs with 276 RBI in 442 games for them. But in 1963, after his second All-Star selection, he was sent to the Cleveland Indians in the same trade that brought slugging first baseman Joe Adcock and pitcher Barry Latman to the Angels. When Latman’s father-in-law heard about the trade, he said, “It’s impossible; is that all they got for Wagner?" 

Wagner had truly come to enjoy playing and living in Los Angeles, and resented the Angels for trading him … some folks close to him say, for the rest of his life.

In  he hit .294 with 28 homers. Wagner also stole 26 bases in 30 attempts in 1964–65.

Wagner ended his career as a respected pinch-hitter, leading the AL in 1968 with 46 appearances in that role, while splitting the season between the Indians and the Chicago White Sox. Purchased by the Cincinnati Reds in December, 1968, he was returned to the White Sox on April 5, 1969, only to be released by them the same day. (Although his 1969 Topps baseball card depicted Wagner as a member of the Reds, he, in fact, never played a single regular-season game for them.)

Wagner then signed as a free agent with his first big league team, the Giants, and made his final appearance, as the Giants hosted the expansion San Diego Padres, October 2, 1969.

Acting career
Following the end of his playing career, Wagner appeared in small acting roles, most prominently in John Cassavetes' 1974 film A Woman Under the Influence and as a member of a Depression-era barnstorming team in The Bingo Long Traveling All-Stars & Motor Kings (1976).

Death
Wagner struggled with alcohol and drug issues, having had numerous financial difficulties after his baseball career ended.  He lived in an abandoned electrical shed next to a dumpster in Los Angeles, which is where his lifeless body was found on January 3, 2004. The coroner ruled that Wagner had died of natural causes.

References

External links

 Leon Wagner at SABR (Baseball BioProject)
 Leon Wagner at Baseball Almanac
 Leon Wagner at American Heroes
 Cooperstown Confidential: The sad saga of Leon Wagner
 
 Leon Wagner Chronology & biography at This Day In Baseball

1934 births
2004 deaths
African-American baseball players
American League All-Stars
Baseball players from Tennessee
Chicago White Sox players
Cleveland Indians players
Hawaii Islanders players
Los Angeles Angels players
Major League Baseball All-Star Game MVPs
Major League Baseball left fielders
Native American sportspeople
San Francisco Giants players
Sportspeople from Chattanooga, Tennessee
St. Louis Cardinals players
Tuskegee Golden Tigers baseball players
20th-century African-American sportspeople
21st-century African-American people
Native American people from Tennessee